HMS Fairy was a three-funnel, 30-knot destroyer of the First World War. One of three similar ships built by Fairfields for the Royal Navy, she was ordered under the 1896–1897 Naval Estimates and the sixth Royal Navy ship to carry this name. She was classified, along with other similar ships, as a C-class destroyer in 1913. She sank in 1918 from damage inflicted by ramming and sinking the German submarine .

Construction and career
She was laid down as Yard No 396 on 19 October 1896, at the Fairfield shipyard at Govan, Glasgow, and launched on 29 May 1897.  During her builder's trials, she made her contracted speed requirement.  She was completed and accepted by the Royal Navy in August 1898. After commissioning she was assigned to the Channel Fleet.  She spent her operational career mainly in Home Waters operating with the Channel Fleet as part of the East Coast Flotilla.

On 2 February 1900, she was commissioned as tender to HMS Vivid, shore establishment at Devonport, for service in the Devonport Instructional flotilla, A mere week into her commission, Fairy dragged her moorings while in the Falmouth harbour, and had her bow on the starboard side and her stem badly damaged as she drifted into other ships of the flotilla. Following repairs in Devonport, she was back in the flotilla later that Spring. She underwent repairs to re-tube her boilers in May 1902. Fairy was refitted in 1908, having her boilers retubed.

On 30 August 1912, the Admiralty directed that all destroyer classes were to be designated by letter.

World War I
From August 1914, she was deployed in the 8th Destroyer Flotilla based at the Firth of Forth, but the next month detached from that formation. By October, she was attached to the Grand Fleet. In July 1917, she was transferred to the 7th Destroyer Flotilla, on the east coast of England, where she would be engaged in convoy work.

On 31 May 1918, while Fairy was escorting an East Coast convoy, the German submarine UC-75 was sighted and rammed by the steamer SS Blaydonian. The U-boat surfaced within the convoy and was attacked and rammed by HMS Fairy. Two submariners leapt onto the destroyer's forecastle as their submarine sank.

She was awarded the battle honour "Belgian Coast 1914–17" for her service.

Pennant numbers

Notes

References

Bibliography
 
 
 
 
 
 
 
 
 

 

Ships built in Govan
1897 ships
C-class destroyers (1913)
World War I destroyers of the United Kingdom
Ships sunk by German submarines in World War I
World War I shipwrecks in the North Sea
Maritime incidents in 1918
Ships sunk in collisions
Gipsy-class destroyers